Fantasy of Flight is an aviation museum in Polk City, Florida.

It opened in November 1995, to house Kermit Weeks' collection of aircraft that, until Hurricane Andrew damaged many in 1992, were housed at the Weeks Air Museum in Tamiami, Florida, On April 6, 2014, it closed to the public, aside from private events and on January 30, 2015, it opened a scaled-down museum displaying a small selection of aircraft while the facility is upgraded for a future reopening.

Many of the aircraft displayed are airworthy and some are flown from the facility's grass runways or its seaplane runway.

Facility 

The facility's main buildings consist of the two large "North" and "South" hangars where aircraft are displayed, the restoration shops, an immersion environment, the gift shop, and the Compass Rose, an Art Deco diner. Across from the entrance are a ropes course and zip line amusements.

Adjoining the hangars there is a tarmac and two grass runways. On the north side of the runways are a maintenance hangar and conference facility. A "back lot" to the south of the main complex contains warehouses and storage and additional restoration facilities. Storage facilities located across Broadway Blvd are accessible to the public via a guided tour. The adjacent Lake Agnes permits seaplane operations, with a designated landing/takeoff area on 18/36 and a ramp to the taxiway.

Aircraft operations 

The airfield is officially known as the "Orlampa Inc. Airport" and uses the airport identifier "FA08." It is designated as private use only and special permission is needed to land there. The field is generally closed to all non-company traffic. The airfield consists of two turf runways: runway 4/22 and runway 14/32. The airfield appears as "Orlampa" on the Jacksonville sectional chart. The name "Orlampa" was originated by Kermit Weeks based on the airfield being approximately midway between the cities of Orlando and Tampa.

Waldo Wright's Flying Service offers airplane rides for sale from the Fantasy of Flight field during parts of the year and operates a Boeing PT-17 Stearman and a New Standard D-25. The Stearman is used for 30 minute long 'hands-on experience' flights, in which the customer takes control of the aircraft at some point during the flight. The D-25 is used for 15 minute barnstorming flights, in which up to four customers sit in the forward open cockpit of the aircraft as a qualified pilot flies the aircraft.

Collection 
The Fantasy of Flight collection contains the following aircraft, although not all are present at any given time as they may be rented out to other facilities, or flown to events, or undergoing additional maintenance or restoration. Most of the collection is in the north and south hangars which are now closed to the public, while a small number are displayed at the interim museum in the old maintenance hangar. In 2012, the "Golden Hill" storage facility opened across the road from the main facility. A number of aircraft have been re-located into this new building, notably the Douglas B-23 Dragon and the Boeing B-29 Superfortress nose.

Aerostar Balloon – N69FF
Airco DH.4 – Displayed as U.S. Mail aircraft.
Albatros D.Va – reproduction  built by Peter Jackson's aviation shop.
Antonov An-2 – N4301U
Avro Cadet – N643AV
Avro Lancaster – KB976 – Stored in a number of shipping boxes behind the museum's workshop. Nose was guillotined from the main body after a hangar collapse at Woodford Aerodrome in 1987. KB976 made the last official RCAF flight of this type with Flight Lieutenant Lynn Garrison as captain and Flt Lt Ralph Langemann as co-pilot during an air show in Calgary, Alberta July 4, 1964.
Bachem Ba 349 Natter – reproduction
"Barber" Valkyrie – reproduction
Beechcraft Model 17 Staggerwing – N52962 – Displayed at the Florida Air Museum at Lakeland Linder International Airport.
Beechcraft AT-11 Kansan – N92KC
Bell 47G Helicopter – N147DP – Displayed in M*A*S*H 4077 paint scheme.
Bell P-63 Kingcobra – N91448 – Formerly on loan to the Florida Air Museum, the plane was partially disassembled and returned to Fantasy of Flight on March 13, 2014.
Benoist XIV – Full size reproduction was built at Fantasy of Flight in an attempt to recreate the first scheduled airline service (using a winged aircraft) on the 100th anniversary of its first flight on January 1, 2014. Though the plane was completely assembled and taxi tested, the plane could not achieve the necessary speed to lift off and was not flown at the event.
Boeing 100 – Under off site restoration after damaged by Hurricane Andrew at the former Weeks Air Museum.
Boeing B-17G Flying Fortress – USAAF 44-83542, displayed as 42-37994 "Piccadilly Princess." A second B-17, 44-83525 "Suzy Q," is stored.
Boeing P2B-1S Superfortress (U.S. Navy B-29) – USAAF 45-21787 and USN/USMC Bureau Number (BuNo) 84029 "Fertile Myrtle". Restored nose displayed at  "Golden Hill" facility.
Brown B-2 Racer – reproduction
Bücker Bestmann – N181BU – One of two flying.
Bücker Jungmann – N41455
Bücker Jungmeister – N40BJ – Displayed in Romanian aerobatic pilot, Alexandru Papană's markings.
CAC Boomerang - Under restoration in Australia
CAC Wirraway
Cierva C.30A Autogiro
Consolidated B-24J Liberator – N94459 "Joe" Displayed in Maintenance Hangar. A nose is also displayed in the Officer's Club event facility adjacent to the North Hangar.
Consolidated PBY-5A Catalina – N96UC displayed on the tarmac. An additional PBY is in storage.
Curtiss JN-4D Jenny – N2404
Curtiss Headless Pusher – reproduction
Curtiss TP-40N Warhawk – N923 – The only factory dual-control example flying
Curtiss Robin – NC8313
Curtiss Wright Junior – N10967
Curtiss-Wright CW-19 N19RX – Delivered to Fantasy of Flight in March 2013. Made its first flight in 2014 and still undergoing testing.
Curtiss-Wright CW-22 N888U was in the main hangar but is now in the Golden Hill Facility
de Havilland Mosquito - Mk B. 35 - RS712 - On long-term loan at EAA AirVenture Museum in Oshkosh, Wisconsin.
de Havilland Vampire – Stored
Douglas B-23 Dragon – One of eight remaining. Stored.
Douglas C-47 Skytrain – N1944A 
Douglas DC-3 - Used for advertising alongside the Interstate 4.
Douglas A-24B Banshee – USAAF version of the USN SBD Dauntless, USAAF 42-54643 – Stored.
EKW C-36 –Stored
Fairey Swordfish IV – Stored
Fieseler Fi-156 Storch – N156FS
Fieseler Fi-103 V-1 Flying Bomb – reproduction
Focke Wulf FW-44 Stieglitz – NX44FW
Fokker D.VII – reproduction – Under construction off site with original Mercedes engine.
Fokker D.VIII – N94100 – reproduction, one of two built by Brian Coughlin in New York State, powered with a 160 hp Gnome Monosoupape rotary engine and formerly flown at Old Rhinebeck Aerodrome
Fokker Dr.I Triplane – N2009V – reproduction (the last original example was destroyed in a bombing raid in WW2).
Ford 5AT Trimotor – N9651 – The "City of Philadelphia," which appeared in the film Indiana Jones and the Temple of Doom.
Gloster Meteor Mk IV – In storage
GeeBee Model Z – NR77V – reproduction – Original aircraft destroyed in crash in 1931.
GeeBee R2 Super Sportster – NR2101 – reproduction – Original aircraft destroyed in crash in 1933.
GeeBee Y Sportster – N3215M – reproduction
Grumman F3F Flying Barrel – NX26KW – One of four remaining.
Grumman F6F-3 Hellcat – Stored
Grumman F7F Tigercat – N7626C – Stored
Grumman F9F Panther – Stored
Grumman FM-2 Wildcat – N222FM -
Grumman G-44 Widgeon – N404Q – Displayed at Florida Air Museum at Lakeland Linder International Airport.
Grumman J2F Duck – N1214N - A second example is stored.
Grumman TBM-3E Avenger – N9548Z
Hawker Tempest II – N607LA – Under restoration
Hawker Tempest V – "EJ693" – Under restoration
Hiller Hornet – N125JC – currently the only flyable example.
Howard DGA-5 "Ike" – reproduction
Junkers Ju 52 – "G-BFHG" – Stored
Kawasaki Ki-61 Hien – Disassembled and stored
Kingfisher - Under restoration in Auckland, New Zealand.
Laird Super Solution – reproduction
Lavochkin La-11 – Stored
Lockheed L-1649A Starliner – N974R
Lockheed P-38L Lightning – USAAF 44-26761 stored.
Lockheed Vega 5A/5C – NC105W – One of five remaining. Being restored offsite.
Martin 4-0-4 – N40415 – Stored outside
Martin B-26 Marauder – N4297J – Sole airworthy example.
Messerschmitt Bf 108 - Under restoration.
Messerschmitt Bf 109 – Undergoing offsite restoration in Canada.
Mikoyan-Gurevich MiG-15 – Stored
Mitsubishi A6M Zero – Stored
Morane-Saulnier AI – One of four known.
Morane/Brock Monoplane
Nieuport 17 – N1920 – reproduction – was in the movie Flyboys.
Nord Stampe et Vertongen SV.4 – N1606
North American AT-6D Texan – N3931Y – In Women Airforce Service Pilots markings.
North American B-25J Mitchell – N1943J – Displayed as "Apache Princess."
North American P-51A Mustang – Under off site restoration
North American P-51C Mustang – N1204  – Displayed as USAAF 42-103831  "Ina the Macon Belle" of Tuskegee Airmen pilot Lee Archer.
North American P-51D Mustang – N921 – Displayed as USAAF 45-11507  "Cripes a Mighty 3rd."
Piper L-4J Grasshopper – N5798N – Displayed as 54883.
Pitcairn PA-18 Autogiro
Polikarpov Po-2 – N50074
Polikarpov I-16
Republic P-47 Thunderbolt – Stored in original shipping crate.
Ryan NYP – N211NX – replica – One of a dozen replicas of "The Spirit of St. Louis" of Charles Lindbergh.
Santos-Dumont Demoiselle – N65269
Savoia Marchetti S-56
Seversky P-35A – N106EP Under restoration
Short Sunderland Mk.5 – N814ML – Last airworthy Sunderland.
Sikorsky S-38 – Under off site restoration to flight status.
Sikorsky S-39 – NC50V – "Spirit of Igor", painted in giraffe pattern of the original "Spirit of Africa."
Sikorsky S-43 – visible as part of the restoration shop tour.
Sikorsky S-55 – N111VA
Sopwith 7F.1 Snipe – reproduction built by Peter Jackson’s aviation shop.
Sopwith Pup - reproduction
Spirit of Peace Rozière balloon Capsule – Displayed at the Florida Air Museum.
Spirit of St Louis, reproduction. Powered by Lycoming R-680 engine.
Standard E-1 – N49128 – One of two remaining.
Standard J-1 – N2825D – Appeared in the movies The Spirit of St. Louis and The Great Waldo Pepper.
Stinson L-1 Vigilant – N63230 - Returned to flying status in2013.
Stinson Trimotor – NC11170 – One of two remaining.
Supermarine Spitfire Mk16 – N476TE
Supermarine Spitfire FR Mk14e - N808U - serial MV262. Stored.
Thomas-Morse Scout – N1071B – One of five remaining.
Travel Air 4000 – NC174V – Displayed in U.S. Mail markings.
Tupolev Tu-2 – Stored.
UTVA Aero 3 Icarus – N906H
Vought F4U-4 Corsair – Displayed as BuNo 97286, G5, "Angel Of Okinawa."
Vultee BT-15 - Under restoration 
Weeks Benoist – N1913B – reproduction under construction
Weeks Der Jaeger D-IX – N30KW – Owner Kermit Weeks' first self-built aircraft.
Weeks Solution S1-WS – N300KW – aerobatic aircraft designed and built by Kermit Weeks, stored.
Weeks Special S-1W – N69KW –  aerobatic aircraft based on Pitts Special built by Kermit Weeks.
Westland Lysander –  returned in March 2014 having been displayed at Florida Air Museum at Lakeland Linder International Airport.

Immersion environments

The immersion environments are part of the main facility now closed to the public, but are available as part of the facilities which can be rented for events. Visitors walk through several immersion environments as they enter the attraction. From the lobby, guests walk into the interior of a World War II-era Douglas C-47 Skytrain complete with lighting and sound effects as if the aircraft were conducting paratrooper operations. Guests pass a seated paratrooper in full kit and move forward toward the Jumpmaster figure standing at the open side hatch. Over the hatch blinks a red "Ready" light which switches to a green "Jump" light as the guest approaches the hatch. Through the hatch is the entry to the attraction.

Other immersion environments include a "sensation of flight" simulator, followed by a celebration of the early days of flight. Then, a passage covered by heavy shrapnel-resistant curtains leads visitors into a full-scale representation of the trench warfare of World War I, complete with aircraft overhead. It was, in part, due to the development of aerial warfare that trench fighting became obsolete.

The final immersion display includes the collection's Boeing B-17 Flying Fortress housed in a large darkened room staged to appear as a winter evening at RAF Horham, home of the 95th Bombardment Group (Heavy) during World War II. The full-scale diorama, complete with ground vehicles, outbuildings, and landscaping, represents a maintenance area and one of the B-17's engine cowlings and propellers are removed to maintenance stands in front of the aircraft. Guests can enter the plane via the aft side hatch in the tail, walk through the bomb bay, visit the cockpit, and exit near the nose of the aircraft.

Golden Hill Storage Facility

For years Fantasy of Flight has maintained a storage building opposite the main property on the north side of Broadway Boulevard where aircraft awaiting restoration were stored. In late 2011, work began on a second building to double the storage space with the intention of spreading out the stored items a bit and opening the buildings to the public on a limited basis. Finally, in June 2011 preparations were sufficient to open one building for a special preview over the Father's Day holiday. The response to the limited, self-guided experience was overwhelmingly positive, and the building joined the attraction's public programming in the summer of 2012, with the second building scheduled to open shortly thereafter.

The buildings are known by Fantasy of Flight as the "Golden Hill" facility as a tongue in cheek reference to the Paul E. Garber Preservation, Restoration, and Storage Facility of the National Air and Space Museum which is nicknamed "Silver Hill" by the NASM staff. Fantasy of Flight guest access to the Golden Hill facility is via over-the-road trolley operated from the main parking lot in the mornings. Guests are allowed to explore the facility on their own with docents present to answer questions. The facility closes at midday due to the lack of comfortable air handling equipment in the steel buildings which can get hot in the Florida sun.

N1944A 

In the summer of 2011, Kermit Weeks and a crew from Fantasy of Flight flew to Cotswold Airport in the United Kingdom to evaluate a Douglas C-47 Skytrain for possible purchase. The aircraft has a distinguished war record including sorties during the D-Day invasion and Operation Market Garden.

At the end of July, Weeks went forward with the purchase. His crew conducted minor repairs and the plane, registration number N1944A, was flown back to the United States by Weeks and his crew. Due to weather delays on some legs of the trip, the journey took a total of 11 days and covered approximately 4500 miles from Kemble, UK to Oshkosh, Wisconsin. Fans of the aircraft, Kermit Weeks, or Fantasy of Flight were able to watch the trip documented daily on Fantasy of Flight's Facebook page as the crew sent back pictures and observations along the way.

The aircraft arrived without incident on August 4, 2011, at Oshkosh. It was on display at the EAA AirVenture Museum for several months before being moved permanently to the campus of Fantasy of Flight in Polk City. On May 1, 2012, the C-47 was finally flown south to Fantasy of Flight, arriving on May 2 after an overnight stop in Douglas, Georgia. The aircraft is now on display at the attraction and open to guest walk-throughs.

Douglas DC-3 attraction sign 

Standing along the side of Interstate 4 near the exit for Fantasy of Flight is a Douglas DC-3 painted with the attraction's name to get the attention of passers by. The aircraft itself is not part of the collection and was, in fact, specifically purchased for its intended purpose as an attraction sign. The airframe is far too corroded to make restoration of the DC-3 feasible. The aircraft was displayed for a period of time in a 'crashed' position, nose down in the ground with a mannequin hanging from the tail wheel, apparently a 'man' evacuating the aircraft with a parachute. The mannequin was dressed up for certain occasions around the year, including Santa Claus for Christmas; Uncle Sam for Independence Day; and a Pilgrim for Thanksgiving.

The aircraft in this crashed position received a mixture of criticism and compliments. Some people claimed that the display made the aircraft look bad and set a bad example to airline passengers without an aviation background, while others found the position of the aircraft comical and many enjoyed guessing what the mannequin would be dressed as next. Currently, the aircraft is in an upright position with the mannequin seated in the opened cockpit hatch on the left hand side.

The Compass Rose Diner 

Adjacent to the attraction's lobby is an Art Deco themed restaurant called "The Compass Rose Diner" which features the characteristics of diners associated with airports during the 1930s and early 1940s. The restaurant features tall windows, multi-hued terrazzo floors, and the curved architectural lines associated with the Art Deco period. The diner was open to the public and served a short-order menu similar to that of lunch counters popularized during the pre-World War II era. When the main facility was closed to the public in 2014, the diner was closed and much of its equipment sold off, though the space itself is still available as part of the venue's rental offerings.

Partial closing
On March 4, 2014, Fantasy of Flight announced that they would close to the public after April 6, 2014, but continue to stage private events. They further announced that they would reopen to the public in late 2014 as a scaled-down museum, with reduced admission prices, while they simultaneously begin to design and build the main facility into more of a destination attraction that would appeal to a wider audience rather than just aviation aficionados. Ironically, the announcement that the facility would soon be closing its doors to the public has caused a significant upswell in visitors. Crowds have been so large that the facility has had to make use of its overflow parking area on multiple occasions since the announcement.  As of 2017 the museum is open on Fridays, Saturdays, and most Sundays.

See also 
 Planes of Fame
 Commemorative Air Force
 Battle of Britain Memorial Flight at RAF Coningsby, UK
 Shuttleworth Collection at Old Warden near Biggleswade in Bedfordshire, England;
 Champlin Fighter Collection at the Seattle Museum of Flight (formerly housed at Mesa, Arizona);
 The Lone Star Flight Museum in Galveston, Texas.
 The Yankee Air Museum in Ypsilanti, Michigan.
 The Historic Aircraft Restoration Museum in St Louis, Missouri

Notes

External links 

 

Aerospace museums in Florida
Museums in Polk County, Florida
Military and war museums in Florida
1995 establishments in Florida
Airports in Polk County, Florida